The Diocese of Lausanne, Geneva and Fribourg is a Latin Catholic diocese in Switzerland, which is (as all sees in the Alpine country) exempt (i.e. immediately subject to the Holy See, not part of any ecclesiastical province).

It comprises the Cantons of Fribourg, Geneva, Vaud and Neuchâtel, with the exception of certain parishes of the right bank of the Rhône belonging to the Diocese of Sion (Sitten). It was created by the merger in 1821 of the Diocese of Lausanne and the Diocese of Geneva, both prince-bishoprics until they were secularized during the Reformation. Until 1924, it was called the Diocese of Lausanne and Geneva. The diocese has its seat at Fribourg; it has 680,000 Catholics, constituting 51% of the population of its district (as of 2004). The current bishop is Charles Morerod, O.P., who was ordained and installed on 11 December 2011.

Despite the name, it has no direct link with the former Roman Catholic Diocese of Geneva (400-1801), which was merged into the then Diocese of Chambéry, which was promoted a Metropolitan see but lost former Genevan territory to the bishopric of Lausanne in 1819.

History

Lausanne 
The origin of the See of Lausanne can be traced to the ancient See of Windisch (Vindonissa). Bubulcus, the first Bishop of Windisch, appeared at the imperial Synod of Epaone for the Arelatic Kingdom of the Burgundians in 517. The second and last known Bishop of Windisch was Gramatius (Grammatius), who signed the decrees of the Synods of Clermont in 535, of Orléans, 541, and that of Orléans in 549. It was generally believed that shortly after this the see was transferred from Windisch to Konstanz, until investigations, particularly by Marius Besson, made it probable that, between 549 and 585, the see was divided and the real seat of the bishops of Windisch transferred to Avenches (Aventicum), while the eastern part of the diocese was united with the Diocese of Konstanz.

According to the Synod of Mâcon of 585 St. Marius seems to have been the first resident Bishop of Avenches. The Chartularium of Lausanne affirms that St. Marius was born in the Burgundian Diocese of Autun about 530, was consecrated Bishop of Avenches in May, 574, and died 31 December, 594. To him we owe a valuable addition (455-581) to the Chronicle of St. Prosper of Aquitaine. The episcopal see of Avenches may have been transferred to Lausanne by Marius, or possibly not before 610.

Lausanne was originally a suffragan of the archbishopric of Lyon (certainly about the seventh century), later of Besançon, from which it was detached by the French Napoleonic Concordat of 1801. In medieval times the diocese extended from the Aar, near Solothurn, to the northern end of the Valley of St. Imier, thence along the Doubs and the ridge of the Jura Mountains to where the Aubonne flows into Lake Geneva, and thence along the north of the lake to Villeneuve whence the boundary-line followed the watershed between Rhône and Aar to the Grimsel, and down the Aar to Attiswil. Thus the diocese included the town of Solothurn and part of its territory that part of the Canton of Berne which lay on the left bank of the River Aar, also Biel/Bienne, the Valley of St. Imier, Jougne and Les Longevilles in the Franche-Comté, the countships of Neuchâtel and Valangin, the greater part of the Canton of Vaud, the Canton of Fribourg, the countship of Gruyère and most of the Bernese Oberland. The present Diocese of Lausanne includes the Cantons of Fribourg, Vaud and Neuchâtel.

Of the bishops who in the seventh century succeeded St. Marius almost nothing is known. Between 594 and 800 only three bishops are known: Arricus, present at the Council of Chalon-sur-Saône, Protasius, elected about 651, and Chilmegisilus, about 670. From the time of Charlemagne until the end of the ninth century the following bishops of Lausanne are mentioned: Udalricus (Ulrich), a contemporary of Charlemagne; Fredarius (about 814); David (827-50), slain in combat with one of the lords of Degerfelden; Hartmann (851-78); Hieronymus (879-92).

The most distinguished subsequent bishops are: Heinrich von Lenzburg (d. 1019), who rebuilt the cathedral in 1000; Hugo (1019–37), a son of Rudolf III of Burgundy, in 1037 proclaimed the "Peace of God"; Burkart von Oltingen (1057–89), one of the most devoted adherents of Emperor Henry IV, with whom he was banished, and made the pilgrimage to Canossa; Guido von Merlen (1130–44), a correspondent of St. Bernard; St. Amadeus of Hauterive, a Cistercian (1144–59), who wrote homilies in honour of the Blessed Virgin; Boniface of Brussels, much venerated (1230/1-39), formerly a master in the Sorbonne University of Paris and head of the cathedral school at Cologne, resigned because of physical ill-treatment, afterwards auxiliary bishop in Brabant (see Ratzinger in "Stimmen aus Maria-Laach", L, 1896, 10-23, 139-57); the Benedictine Louis de la Palud (1432–40), who took part in the Councils of Konstanz (1414), Pavia-Siena (1423) and Basle (1431--) and at the last-named was chosen, in January, 1432, Bishop of Lausanne, against Jean de Prangins, the chapter's choice; Palud was later vice-chamberlain of the conclave whence Amadeus VIII of Savoy emerged as Antipope Felix V, by whom he was made a cardinal; George of Saluzzo, who published synodical constitutions for the reform of the clergy; Cardinal Giuliano della Rovere (1472–76), who in 1503 ascended the papal throne as Julius II.

Meanwhile, the prince-bishops of Lausanne, who had been Counts of Vaud since the time of Rudolph III of Burgundy (1011), and until 1218 subject only to imperial authority, were in 1270 granted the status of prince of the Holy Roman Empire, but their temporal power only extended over a small part of the diocese, namely over the city and district of Lausanne, as well as a few towns and villages in the Cantons of Vaud and Fribourg; on the other hand, the bishops possessed many feoffees among the most distinguished of the patrician families of what is now western Switzerland.

The guardians of the ecclesiastical property (advocati, avoués) of the see were originally the counts of Genevois, then the lords of Gerenstein, the dukes of Zähringen, the counts of Kyburg, lastly the counts (later dukes) of Savoy. These guardians, whose only duty originally was the protection of the diocese, enlarged their jurisdiction at the expense of the diocesan rights and even filled the episcopal see with members of their families. Wearisome quarrels resulted, during which the city of Lausanne, with the aid of Berne and Fribourg, acquired new rights, and gradually freed itself from episcopal suzerainty. When Bishop Sebastian de Montfaucon (1517–60) took sides with the Duke of Savoy in a battle against Berne, the Bernese used this as a pretext to seize the city of Lausanne. On 31 March 1536, Hans Franz Nägeli entered Lausanne as conqueror, abolished Catholicism, and began a religious revolution. The bishop was obliged to flee, the ecclesiastical treasure was taken to Berne, the cathedral chapter was dissolved (and never re-established), while the cathedral was given over to the Swiss Reformed Church. Bishop Sebastian died an exile in 1560, and his three successors were likewise exiles. It was only in 1610, under Bishop Johann VII of Watteville, that the see was provisionally re-established at Fribourg, where it has since remained. 

The cantons of Vaud, Neuchâtel and Berne were entirely lost by the See of Lausanne to the Reformation. By the French revolutionary Constitution Civile du Clergé (1790) the Parishes of the French Jura fell to the Diocese of Belley, and this was confirmed by the Concordat of 1801. In 1814 the parishes of Solothurn, in 1828 those of the Bernese Jura, and in 1864 also that district of Berne on the left bank of the Aar were attached to the bishopric of Basle. In compensation, Pius VII assigned, in a papal brief of 20 September 1819, the city of Geneva and twenty parishes belonging to the old Diocese of Geneva (which in 1815 had become Swiss) to the See of Lausanne. The bishop (in 1815 Petrus Tohias Yenni) retained his residence at Fribourg, and since 1821 has borne the title and arms of the Bishops of Lausanne and Geneva. His vicar general resides at Geneva, and is always parish priest of that city.

Lausanne and Geneva 
Bishop Yenni died on 8 December 1845 and was succeeded by Etienne Marilley. Deposed in 1848 by the Cantons of Berne, Geneva, Vaud and Neuchâtel, owing to serious differences with the Radical regime at Fribourg, Marilley was kept a prisoner for fifty days in the Château de Chillon, on Lake Geneva, and then spent eight years in exile in France; he was allowed to return to his diocese on 19 December 1856.

In 1864, Pope Pius IX appointed the vicar general of Geneva, Gaspard Mermillod, as an auxiliary bishop. In 1873, Pius IX detached the Genevese territory from the diocese, made it an apostolic vicariate, and appointed Mermillod as vicar apostolic. By this action, Geneva was again severed from the Diocese of Lausanne and Freiburg, contrary to the wishes of the civil authorities, and, it was asserted, the wishes of a majority of the Catholic population. The Apostolic Vicariate of Geneva was not recognized by either the State Council of Geneva or the Swiss Federal Council, and Mermillod was banished from Switzerland by a 17 February 1873 decree. When the Holy See condemned this measure, the Government answered, on 12 December 1873, by expelling the Nuncio. After Marilley had resigned his diocese in 1879, Monsignor Christophore Cosandey, Provost at Fribourg's seminary, was elected Bishop of Lausanne and Geneva, and after his death, Mermillod. The Apostolic Vicariate of Geneva was given up, the conflict with the Government ended, and the decree of expulsion against Mermillod was revoked. In 1890, Pope Leo XIII made Mermillod a cardinal and he moved to Rome. Monsignor Joseph Déruaz was named as his successor.

Reports of sex abuse
On July 15, 2020, a Vatican investigation revealed that the number of reported cases of abuse involving Catholic priests and monks serving in the Diocese of Lausanne, Geneva and Fribourg have been increasing over the past few years and that the payment of financial compensation which people in the Diocese distributed for victims of abuse totaled CHF675,000 ($718,000) in 2018 - up from CHF425,000 in the previous year - according to figures released by the Vatican News. However, another Catholic Church inquiry found the Bishop Charles Morerod did not protect a former priest in the Diocese who was facing sex abuse allegations, but that he instead "downplayed" the seriousness of the allegations when they were reported to him. The accused former priest, who submitted his resignation the previous month, was alleged to have sexually abused a 17-year-old and molested a fellow priest between 1998 and 2011.

Bishops of Lausanne, Geneva and Fribourg 
The see had its borders changed in 1924 and became the diocese of Lausanne, Geneva and Fribourg

Marius Besson (7 May 1920 Appointed – 22 Feb 1945 Died)
François Charrière (20 Oct 1945 Appointed – 29 Dec 1970 Retired)
Pierre Mamie (29 Dec 1970 Appointed – 9 Nov 1995 Retired)
Amédée Grab O.S.B. (9 Nov 1995 Appointed – 12 Jun 1998 Confirmed, Bishop of Chur)
Bernard Genoud (18 Mar 1999 Appointed – 21 Sep 2010 Died)
Charles Morerod, O.P. (3 Nov 2011 Appointed – )

Statistics 
According to Büchi (see bibliography) and the Dictionnaire géographique de la Suisse (Neuchâtel, 1905), III, 49 sqq., the diocese numbered approximately 434,049 Protestants and 232,056 Catholics; consequently, the latter formed somewhat more than one-third of the whole population of the bishopric. The Catholics inhabit principally the Canton of Fribourg (excepting the Lake District) and the country parishes transferred to Geneva in 1515, four communes in the Canton of Neuchâtel, and ten in the Canton of Vaud. The Catholic population in the Cantons of Fribourg and Geneva consisted principally of farmers, in both of the other cantons it is also recruited from the labouring classes. The Catholics were distributed among 193 parishes, of which 162 allotted to Lausanne, 31 to Geneva. The number of secular priests was 390, those belonging to orders 70. 

Among the more important educational establishments of diocese, besides those already mentioned, are: the University of Fribourg ; the theological seminary of St. Charles at Fribourg, with seven ecclesiastical professors; the cantonal school of St. Michel, also at Fribourg, which comprises a German and French gymnasium, a Realschule (corresponding somewhat to the English first-grade schools) and commercial school, as well as a lyceum, the rector of which was a clergyman. This school had in 1910 about 800 pupils, with 40 ecclesiastical and as many lay professors. Three other cantonal universities existed in the diocese: Geneva (founded by Calvin in 1559, and in 1873 raised to the rank of a university with five faculties); Neuchâtel (1866, academy; 1909, university); Lausanne (1537, academy; university since 1890, with five faculties). Geneva and Lausanne both have cantonal Protestant theological faculties, Neuchâtel a "Faculté de théologie de l'église indépendante de l'état". 

For the government of the diocese there were, besides the bishop, two vicars-general, one living at Geneva, the other at Fribourg. There were, moreover, a provicarius generalis, who is also chancellor of the diocese, and a secretary. The cathedral chapter of Lausanne (with 32 canons was suppressed at the time of the Protestant Reformation and has never been re-established, in consequence of which the choice of a bishop rests with the Holy See. In 1512 Julius II established a collegiate chapter in the church of St. Nicholas at Fribourg, which is immediately subject to the Holy See, with a provost appointed by the Great Council, also a dean, a cantor and ten prebendaries. This collegiate church took the place of the diocesan cathedral, lacking since the cathedral of St. Pierre at Geneva and that of Notre-Dame at Lausanne were given over to Protestantism at the time of the Reformation.

See also 
 Convent of Saint-Hyacinth, Fribourg
 List of Catholic dioceses in Switzerland
 Roman Catholic Diocese of Geneva

Notes

References

Sources and external links 
 GCatholic 
 
 At catholic-hierarchy.org

 
Religious organizations established in 1821
Roman Catholic dioceses in Switzerland
Diocese (Roman Catholic)
Religion in Geneva
Fribourg
Roman Catholic dioceses and prelatures established in the 19th century
1821 establishments in Switzerland